Manawahe  is a rural area south of Matatā within the Whakatāne District and Bay of Plenty region of New Zealand's North Island. It is based in hills to the west of the Rangitaiki plain.

Demographics

Manawahe had a population of 996 at the 2018 New Zealand census, an increase of 108 people (12.2%) since the 2013 census, and an increase of 174 people (21.2%) since the 2006 census. There were 381 households, comprising 498 males and 498 females, giving a sex ratio of 1.0 males per female. The median age was 48.9 years (compared with 37.4 years nationally), with 159 people (16.0%) aged under 15 years, 126 (12.7%) aged 15 to 29, 546 (54.8%) aged 30 to 64, and 165 (16.6%) aged 65 or older.

Ethnicities were 84.9% European/Pākehā, 21.4% Māori, 1.2% Pacific peoples, 2.1% Asian, and 2.1% other ethnicities. People may identify with more than one ethnicity.

The percentage of people born overseas was 13.3, compared with 27.1% nationally.

Although some people chose not to answer the census's question about religious affiliation, 59.0% had no religion, 28.3% were Christian, 1.8% had Māori religious beliefs, 0.6% were Buddhist and 1.8% had other religions.

Of those at least 15 years old, 132 (15.8%) people had a bachelor's or higher degree, and 171 (20.4%) people had no formal qualifications. The median income was $33,900, compared with $31,800 nationally. 177 people (21.1%) earned over $70,000 compared to 17.2% nationally. The employment status of those at least 15 was that 429 (51.3%) people were employed full-time, 144 (17.2%) were part-time, and 27 (3.2%) were unemployed.

Education
Manawahe School was operating by 1912 but closed in 2010 due to a falling roll and problems with governance. The school building became a base for the Manawahe Kokako Trust.

References

Whakatane District
Populated places in the Bay of Plenty Region